Cotyclytus amazonicus is a species of beetle in the family Cerambycidae. It was described by Ernst Fuchs in 1975.

References

Cotyclytus
Beetles described in 1975